Below are the results of the FIS Alpine World Ski Championships 2007 downhill men's race which took place on 11 February 2007.

Results

References 

Men's downhill
2007